Gerdab-e Olya may refer to:
 Gerdab-e Olya, Chaharmahal and Bakhtiari
 Gerdab-e Olya, Kohgiluyeh and Boyer-Ahmad